Cassius Odayne Burton (born 12 November 1991) is a Jamaican cricketer who has played for both the Jamaica national team and the Combined Campuses and Colleges in West Indian domestic cricket.

Burton made his List A debut in January 2015, playing for the Combined Campuses against Guyana in the 2014–15 Regional Super50. He played only one other match at the tournament, in the team's semi-final loss to Trinidad and Tobago. Burton's first-class debut came later in the season, during the 2014–15 Regional Four Day Competition. In that competition, he played for Jamaica rather than the Combined Campuses.

References

External links
Player profile and statistics at CricketArchive
Player profile and statistics at ESPNcricinfo

1991 births
Living people
Combined Campuses and Colleges cricketers
Jamaica cricketers
Jamaican cricketers
People from Manchester Parish